Modiolus areolatus, or the bearded horse-mussel a species of bivalve mollusc in the family Mytilidae. It is found in New Zealand.

References 

Bivalves described in 1850
Taxa named by John Gould
Bivalves of New Zealand
areolatus